The 7th Hong Kong Awards ceremony, honored the best films of 1987 and took place on 10 April 1988 at Hong Kong Academy for Performing Arts, Wan Chai, Hong Kong. The ceremony was hosted by Lydia Shum and Paul Chung, during the ceremony awards are presented in 14 categories. The ceremony was sponsored by City Entertainment Magazine.

Awards
Winners are listed first, highlighted in boldface, and indicated with a double dagger.

References

External links
 Official website of the Hong Kong Film Awards

1988
1987 film awards
1988 in Hong Kong